The Sun Odyssey 26 is a French sailboat that was designed by Philippe Briand and the Jeanneau Design Office, as a blue water cruiser and first built in 2003.

Production
The design was built by Jeanneau in France, starting in 2003, but it is now out of production.

Design
The Sun Odyssey 26 is a recreational keelboat, built predominantly of fiberglass, with wood trim. It has a fractional sloop rig, with a nearly plumb stem, a walk-through reverse transom with a swimming platform, an internally mounted spade-type rudder controlled by a tiller and a fixed fin keel or optional centerboard. It displaces .

The design has sleeping accommodation for four people, with a double "V"-berth around a table in the bow and an aft cabin with a centered double berth. The galley is located on the starboard side just forward of the companionway ladder. The galley is equipped with a two-burner stove and a sink. The enclosed head is located opposite the galley, on the port side.

For sailing downwind the design may be equipped with a symmetrical spinnaker.

See also
List of sailing boat types

References

External links

Photo of a Sun Odyssey 26 showing bow
Photo of a Sun Odyssey 26 showing stern

Keelboats
2000s sailboat type designs
Sailing yachts
Sailboat type designs by Philippe Briand
Sailboat type designs by Jeanneau Design Office
Sailboat types built by Jeanneau